Warwick Services is a motorway service station on the M40 motorway in Warwickshire, England.

It is situated on two bases at each side of the motorway, and was opened in early 1996 as the second of four service stations which serve the M40. It was the second of four service stations to open on the motorway.

Throughout 2007 the northbound Days Inn hotel was closed as the ground floor had completely flooded, although it has since reopened.

Until recently they had to be signed as 'Welcome Break Coffee Primo' as they only recently gained a KFC outlet. The southbound services were one of the first to gain a KFC facility.

Cultural references
The northbound services featured in an episode of Top Gear.

References

External links 
 Motorway Services Online — Warwick services

1996 establishments in England
M40 motorway service stations
Welcome Break motorway service stations
Services
Buildings and structures in Warwickshire
Transport in Warwickshire